The 2023 season is Kedah Darul Aman's 15th season in the Malaysia Super League since the league's inception in 2004.

Management Team

Squad

Friendlies

Pre-season

2023 Harapan Cup (1–4 February)

Tour of Turkey (4–9 February)

Competitions

Malaysia Super League

Results summary

Fixtures and results

Malaysia FA Cup

Malaysia Cup

Transfers and contracts

Transfers in
Pre-season

Loan in
Pre-season

Transfers out

Pre-season

Loan Out
Pre-season

Loan Return
Mid-season

Retained / Promoted

Statistics

Appearances and goals
Players with no appearances not included in the list.

Goalscorers

References 

2023 in Malaysian football
Kedah